Yellow wagtail has been split into 2 species:
 Western yellow wagtail, 	Motacilla flava
 Eastern yellow wagtail, Motacilla tschutschensis